The Caterpillar D4 track-type tractor is a small bulldozer manufactured by Caterpillar Inc.

Caterpillar first introduced the RD4 in 1936 as the diesel follow on to the successful CAT 30 gas model. In 1935 Caterpillar had started the naming convention of "RD" for diesel or "R" for regular gasoline, followed by a number to indicate the relative engine size. In 1937 the "R" was dropped, and just a "D" was used for the diesel versions. The D4 U series was fitted with the more powerful D315 engine. The later D4 series engines quickly increased in power, so the number "4" just became a figure of merit rather than indicating actual engine power.

Version details
6U = Narrow gauge 
7U = Wide Gauge 
 Caterpillar RD4 - 1936-37 (4G) with 4-cylinder D4400 engine
 Caterpillar D4 - 1937-39 (4G) with 4-cylinder D4400 engine
 Caterpillar D4 - 1939-43 (7J) with 4-cylinder D4400 engine
 Caterpillar D4 - 1943-45 (2T) with 4-cylinder D4400 engine
 Caterpillar D4 - 1945-47 (5T) with 4-cylinder D4400 engine
 Caterpillar D4 - 1947-59 6U1 > 6U12781, 7U1-7U44307 Cat 4-cylinder D315 engine.
 Caterpillar D4C - 1959-63
 Caterpillar D4D - 1963-77
 Caterpillar D4E - 1977-84
 Caterpillar D4H - 1985-96
 Caterpillar D4C SII -1990-93
 Caterpillar D4C SIII - 1993

Tracked shovels
The Caterpillar D4 was used as the base tractor for the Trackson built loader that was known as the T4 or Traxcavator shovel.

See also
 Caterpillar D5
 Caterpillar D3
 Caterpillar D2
 List of Caterpillar Inc. machines
 Heavy equipment
 G-numbers Army cats.
 TM 9-2800 military vehicles
 SNL G151 light tractor

References

External links
Plantdata.Com

Caterpillar Inc. vehicles
Tractors
Tracked vehicles
Bulldozers